The Medallion is a 2003 action comedy film directed by Hong Kong film director Gordon Chan in his first English-language film, who also wrote the screenplay with Bey Logan, Paul Wheeler, Bennett Joshua Davlin and Alfred Cheung

Who also produced. The film stars Jackie Chan, Lee Evans, Claire Forlani, and Julian Sands. It was much less successful than Chan's other American films such as the Rush Hour film series, Shanghai Noon and its sequel, Shanghai Knights. The film was theatrically released on 15 August 2003 in Hong Kong and 22 August 2003 in the United States by TriStar Pictures.

In the story, Eddie (Jackie Chan) is a Hong Kong police officer hired by Interpol to capture a crime lord known as Snakehead (Sands) and prevent him from kidnapping a chosen boy with special powers and a medallion that gives superhuman power and immortality.

Much of the film features supernatural and mystical themes, though it is filled with action and comedy. The film received negative reviews from critics.  Even though the film's United States box office result was strong enough for Sony/TriStar Pictures to make profit, the film only grossed $34 million in worldwide box office against $41 million production budget.

Plot
Eddie Yang is a Hong Kong police inspector co-operating with Interpol in the capture of a crime lord named AJ "Snakehead" Staul. Snakehead procures an ancient book from a Chinese bookstore keeper, which tells the story of a boy being chosen every thousand years to bind the two halves of a legendary medallion. In Hong Kong, Eddie and Interpol agent Arthur Watson lead a raid to capture Snakehead and his men, who are about to kidnap the boy, named Jai. Eddie and the agents fight off Snakehead's men, infiltrating the temple containing Jai. The agents save Jai, but Snakehead eludes them. Two weeks later, Snakehead captures Jai aboard a cargo boat in Hong Kong. Eddie and a team of Hong Kong police engage and defeat several of Snakehead's men, but Snakehead escapes with Jai to Dublin, Ireland.

In Ireland, Eddie is assigned to help Interpol with the investigation, much to Watson's annoyance. Eddie also reunites with his girlfriend, a British Interpol agent named Nicole James. By chance, Eddie later encounters and apprehends one of Snakehead's top men, who confesses Jai is being held in the harbor. Eddie, Watson, and Nicole move to rescue Jai, defeating several Snakehead agents in the process. Eddie and Jai end up trapped inside a container, which is knocked into the water by one of Snakehead's men before they can be released. Eddie keeps Jai alive by finding an inflatable tent, and securely putting Jai inside, but Eddie dies from drowning. After being rescued, Jai uses his medallion on Eddie's body.

In the morgue, Watson grieves over Eddie's body and prepares to say his last words, when Eddie suddenly appears beside him. Eddie realizes Jai used the medallion to resurrect him, and his former body vanishes into dust. Jai splits the medallion into its two-halves, giving one of them to Eddie. Snakehead's men appear in the hospital to recapture Jai, and during the fight, Eddie discovers the medallion has also granted him superhuman strength and immortality.

Nicole looks after Jai, but he is captured again by Snakehead. At his castle hideout, Snakehead forces Jai to activate the medallion so he can gain its power, but with only one half of it, Snakehead only gains superhuman strength and remains mortal. To steal the other half, Snakehead and his men attack Watson's family. Watson's Chinese wife reveals herself to be a police operative like him, much to Watson's surprise as he kept his job secret from his family. Together they fight off the attack from Snakehead's men.

Eddie, Watson, and Nicole learn the location of Snakehead's castle lair and go to finish him once and for all. The operation runs smoothly at first, but Snakehead kills Nicole and becomes immortal. He and Eddie engage in a vicious fight until Eddie uses the medallion to take away the life it gave, which leads to the serpent and fish from the medallion appearing and taking Snakehead, which traps him in the medallion. Jai allows Eddie to use the medallion to resurrect Nicole, who also gains super-strength and immortality. The two then run at superhuman speed into the distance as Jai enters another dimension through a portal, frightening Watson.

Cast
 Jackie Chan as Inspector Eddie Yang 
 Lee Evans as Interpol Inspector Arthur Watson 
 Claire Forlani as Inspector Nicole James 
 Alex Bao as Jai
 Julian Sands as Snakehead/AJ Staul 
 Johann Myers as Giscard
 John Rhys-Davies as Commander Hammerstock-Smythe 
 Anthony Wong as Lester Wong (Snakehead's assistant)
 Christy Chung as Charlotte Watson 
 Billy Hill as Miles Watson
 Nicholas Tse as waiter at the restaurant (cameo) 
 Edison Chen as waiter at the restaurant (cameo)

Snakehead's henchmen
 Scott Adkins 
 Bruce Khan
 Han Guan Hua
 Paul Andreovski
 Nicola Berwick
 Reuben Langdon (as Reuben Christopher Langdon)
 Hiro Hayama (as Hiroyoshi Komuro)
 Mark Strange (as Michael Strange)
 Matt Routledge (as Matthew James Routledge)
 Chris Torres (uncredited)
 Brad Allan (uncredited)
 Jude Poyer (uncredited)

Production

With a projected budget of $35 million, the film was at the time the most expensive Hong Kong production ever.

Original plot and conception
Highbinders was the film's working title. In the original plot, those who were given power by the medallion became Highbinders, and Snakehead's goal was to create a Highbinder army at his disposal.

According to the editors' commentary, The Medallion wasn't American-made. However, Columbia-TriStar bought the distribution and editing rights worldwide except in Japan, France, and Hong Kong (but these three countries retain the American cut of the film, the only cut ever made). The original cut was meant to be around 108 minutes. The plot of the film explained Snakehead's crime syndicate of human smuggling, the deaths that occurred from it, and his desire to create an army of Highbinders to aid his organization. These details were all cut to focus on the medallion. As a result of several scene cuts, some original dialogue was overdubbed, including a small amount of Cantonese dialogue.

Over 20 minutes of these deleted scenes can be viewed on the U.S. DVD. Among these scenes are alternate endings where Eddie prevents Nicole's death, an extended fight sequence between Eddie and Snakehead's men, and an alternate ending to the chase sequence between Eddie and Giscard.

Filming
Filming took place in August 2001 in Dublin, Ireland. Production took a break while Jackie Chan shot 'The Tuxedo', and production resumed in Asia later that year. Filming took place in Dublin Castle, and in the Wicklow countryside. The filmmakers had initially planned to shoot scenes in Australia but were convinced to film in Dublin instead.

Reception

Box office
In its US release, The Medallion was No. 5 at the box office on its opening weekend and fell steadily lower during its 10-week release. Overall, it has earned $22.2 million, ranking No. 42 among all martial arts films released in the US and eighth among the Jackie Chan films distributed in the US. The US box office performance had exceeded Sony/TriStar Pictures' profitability target ('mid-teens' box office target).

Critical response
The film received generally negative reviews from critics. On Rotten Tomatoes the film has a rating of 17% based on reviews from 125 critics. The site's consensus states: "The use of special effects diminishes some of Chan's appeal in this disposable picture."
On Metacritic the film has a score of 38% based on reviews from 30 critics, indicating "generally unfavorable reviews". 
Audiences surveyed by CinemaScore gave the film a grade B.

 Mick LaSalle, San Francisco Chronicle: "The best of Jackie Chan's American movies, a pleasant little action comedy that makes one wonder how other filmmakers could ever get it wrong."
 Roger Ebert, Chicago Sun-Times: "A disposable entertainment, redeemed by silliness, exaggeration, and Chan's skill and charm. I would not want to see it twice, but I liked seeing it once." Ebert called it an improvement over The Tuxedo but not as good as Shanghai Knights.
 Steven Rea, Philadelphia Inquirer: "Chan's signature mix of screwball comedy and gymnastic derring-do landed him his own cartoon series a few years back, and The Medallion -- with its bumbling spies and bounding star -- is about as cartoonish as live action gets."

 Dennis Harvey, Variety: "At times plays as if it were aimed at children, but more often simply seems to be aiming blind at whatever genre cliche the five credited writers fix upon in any given scene."
 Wesley Morris, Boston Globe: "Moves from cheekiness to ineptitude, often in a single take."
 Jami Bernard, New York Daily News: "Evans fumbles through painfully extended homophobic jokes, weak double entendres and agonizingly contorted double-takes."
 Marc Savlov, Austin Chronicle: "One of the Peking Opera-trained superstar's most mediocre films, rivaling last year's God-awful The Tuxedo for sheer messy filmmaking and brazen acts of tedium... Abysmal."

Accolades
 23rd Hong Kong Film Awards
 Nomination: Best Action Choreography (Sammo Hung)
 Nomination: Best Visual Effects (Matthew Gidney)

Notes

References

External links

 
 
 
 
 

2003 films
2003 action comedy films
2003 martial arts films
2000s adventure comedy films
2000s buddy comedy films
2000s fantasy adventure films
American action comedy films
American adventure comedy films
American buddy comedy films
American fantasy adventure films
American martial arts comedy films
English-language Hong Kong films
Films about Interpol
Films directed by Gordon Chan
Films shot in Dublin (city)
Films shot in the Republic of Ireland
Hong Kong action comedy films
Hong Kong buddy films
Hong Kong fantasy films
Hong Kong martial arts comedy films
Martial arts fantasy films
Resurrection in film
Screen Gems films
TriStar Pictures films
2000s English-language films
2000s American films
2000s Hong Kong films